Cararí (Kararí) is an extinct Arawakan language of Brazil that was spoken on the Mucuim River, a tributary of the Purus River. Ramirez (2019) classifies Cararí as one of the Purus languages.

A  72-word list was collected by Johann Natterer in 1833.

References

Arawakan languages
Languages of Brazil